Bloc 8406 is a small unified coalition of political groups in Vietnam that advocates for democratic reforms in Vietnam. It is named after the date of the group's Manifesto on Freedom and Democracy for Vietnam 2006 declaring the need for democratic reforms in Vietnam. The manifesto  was issued on 8 April 2006 and was signed by 118 dissidents calling for a multiparty state. The support later grew into the thousands.

Notable Bloc 8406 members 
Roman Catholic priest Nguyen Van Ly was sentenced to eight years in prison on March 30, 2007 for his support of the group's manifesto. He was released in 2011, but then he was returned to prison that same year.

Lawyer and labor activist Tran Quoc Hien was accused of being a part of Bloc 8406 in his 2007 trial that led to a five-year prison sentence for "endangering state security". He also posted articles critical to the government online, such as "The Tail", a description of life under Vietnamese secret police (MPS) surveillance.

Former Communist Party official Vi Duc Hoi joined the Bloc after leaving the party in 2007. He was imprisoned in 2011 for "spreading anti-government propaganda" after posting copies of pro-democracy articles online.

References

External links
Manifesto

Political party alliances in Vietnam
Politics of Vietnam
National liberation movements
Vietnamese democracy movements
Political repression in Vietnam
Vietnamese human rights activists
Banned political parties in Vietnam